Big Ten Championship may refer to several sporting events that are sponsored by the Big Ten Conference.
 Big Ten Football Championship Game, crowns the champion of the Big Ten football season
 Big Ten men's basketball tournament, crowns the champion of the Big Ten men's basketball season
 Big Ten women's basketball tournament, crowns the champion of the Big Ten women's basketball season